Sir Oswald Raynor Arthur  (16 December 1905 – 4 December 1973) was a British diplomat and colonial administrator.

Early life and education 
Arthur was born in Poona, the son of Sigismund Raynor Arthur (in the Indian Civil Service, grandson of Sir George Arthur, 1st Baronet) and Constance Hobhouse (daughter of Sir Charles Parry Hobhouse, 3rd Baronet).

He was educated at Charterhouse School and Corpus Christi College, Cambridge.

Career 
Arthur joined the Nigerian Political Service in 1928 as an administrative officer. On 8 May 1935 he married his cousin Mary Elizabeth Spring Rice, the only daughter of Sir Cecil Spring Rice, with whom he had two children. He transferred to the British administration in Cyprus in 1937, becoming the island's Chief Commissioner in 1948. He then moved on to the Americas and became Colonial Secretary of Bermuda 1951–54; Governor of the Falkland Islands 1954–57; and Governor of the Bahamas until 1960.

Arthur was appointed CMG and CVO in 1953 and knighted KCMG in the New Year Honours of 1957. He was made a knight of the Order of St John of Jerusalem in 1954. He was a justice of the peace in East Sussex in 1962.

References

Further reading 
ARTHUR, Sir (Oswald) Raynor, Who's Who and Who Was Who, A & C Black, 1920–2008; online edn, Oxford University Press, Dec 2007

British governors of the Bahamas
Colonial Secretaries of Bermuda
Governors of the Falkland Islands
1905 births
1973 deaths
People from Pune
People educated at Charterhouse School
Alumni of Corpus Christi College, Cambridge
Commanders of the Royal Victorian Order
Knights Commander of the Order of St Michael and St George
Knights of the Order of St John
20th-century Bahamian people
20th-century British politicians